Kapur Chal (also romanised as Kapūr Chāl) is a village in Feyziyeh Rural District in the Central District of Babol County, Mazandaran Province, Iran. As of 2006, its population was 504 in 144 families.

References 

Populated places in Babol County